SS Cantabria was a Spanish-owned cargo steamship that was built in 1919 in Canada and sunk in 1938 in a naval action in the Spanish Civil War in the North Sea. She was built as War Chief, renamed Alfonso Pérez shortly after she was built, and renamed Cantabria during the Spanish Civil War.

Cantabrias wreck is off the coast of Norfolk, 12 miles ENE of Cromer. She was shelled by the Spanish Nationalist auxiliary cruiser Nadir.

Building and career
J Coughlan & Sons of Vancouver, British Columbia, Canada built the ship as War Chief for the UK Shipping Controller. She was launched in 19 August 1918 and completed in February 1919. She had a single screw, and her original engine was a steam turbine. By 1926 this had been replaced with a three-cylinder triple-expansion steam engine that was rated at 532 NHP.

The Shipping Controller initially appointed Raeburn and Vérel of Glasgow to manage War Chief, but by mid-1919 had sold her to AF Pérez, who renamed her Alfonso Pérez and registered her in Santander. Her code letters were HBNP. By 1926 she was equipped for wireless telegraphy, and by 1934 her call sign was EAAL.

In the Asturian miners' strike of 1934 she was used as a prison ship. In 1937 the Departamento de Navegación of Santander requisitioned her for the Republican government and renamed her Cantabria. The Republican authorities used her as a prison ship in Santander.

Sinking
By 1938 Cantabria was charter to a British company called the Mid-Atlantic Shipping Company, based in London. She was not engaged in Spanish trade. She was in passage in ballast from the River Thames to Immingham, whence she was to sail for Leningrad under Captain Manuel Argüelles. Aboard were 33 crew and eight passengers, of whom five were children and three women. The passengers included Argüelles' wife Trinidad, their son Ramon, aged six, their daughter Begoña, aged eight, and another child, aged three.

Auxiliary cruiser Nadir

Nadir was a  auxiliary cruiser of the Spanish Nationalist navy, armed with a  main gun, two  guns and two  anti-aircraft guns. She was converted from the merchant ship Ciudad de Valencia, and took part in the blockade of the Bay of Biscay in 1937. The Nationalists had renamed her to deceive the Spanish Republican Navy about the real number of commerce raiders at sea. Her targets were Republican cargo ships operating from ports in northern Europe. She had been launched on 18 October 1930 at the shipyard Unión Naval de Levante as Infante D. Gonzalo, owned by the Compañía Transmediterránea. The Nationalist government requisitioned her on 30 October 1936.

Attack

Nazi Germany allowed Spanish Nationalist ships to use the port of Emden as a base from which to raid Spanish Republican shipping in the North Sea and the English Channel. At about 11.30 am on 2 November, Argüelles was concerned that a ship was shadowing Cantabria. He changed course a degree or two to see if the other ship followed suit. It did. His officers studied the following ship with binoculars.

But the ship following Cantabria was in fact Nadir. Argüelles again changed course, now heading for the Norfolk coast. Nadir followed and increased speed. In the afternoon Cantabrias crew then saw Nadirs crew raise the Spanish Nationalist flag. At the same time Nadir unmasked her guns and signalled ordering Cantabria "Heave to or I fire". The cruiser then opened fire.

The incident was in international waters, outside British territorial waters, but near enough to the coast to be seen from shore. According to the statement by Argüelles, he refused to stop Cantabria after Nadir fired a shot across her bows. Nearby fishing boats intervened by heading towards Nadir sounding their sirens. This persuaded the cruiser to change course and break off her attack. The fishing boats, satisfied that they had ended the attack, continued on their way.

However, after the fishing boats had gone, Nadir returned and opened fire on Cantabria. A shell struck the bridge, destroying it. The raider circled Cantabria firing shells and raking her with machine-gun fire. A shell penetrated the engine room, rendering Cantabria powerless.

Cantabrias wireless telegraph operator had been sending signals that she was "being shelled by unknown vessel". After her bridge had been destroyed and her engine room disabled he transmitted an SOS signal. He gave Cantabrias position as 8½ miles southeast of Haisbro Light Ship.

Rescue
It was now nearly dark and at 5pm the Cromer Lifeboat  with coxswain Henry Blogg at the helm was launched to rescue Cantabrias crew and passengers. Before H F Bailey arrived, fire spread through the ship. Two boats were lowered and some of the crew and passengers abandoned ship. Captain Argüelles, his wife and children and the second steward, Joaquin Vallego, remained aboard fearing what their fate would be if they surrendering to the insurgents aboard Nadir. With the boats now lowered, Nadir ceased fire.

Two cargo ships saw the attack: the British Monkwood and a Norwegian ship, but they did not attempt a rescue, fearing the reaction of Nadir, which was still in international waters. Monkwood later sent a report to the naval authorities, who sent naval units to the position to ensure that no hostile action would be taken inside British territorial waters. Another British merchant ship, Pattersonian, approached in response to Cantabrias SOS. Captain Blackmore of Pattersonian had seen Nadir head towards the lifeboat, and steered his ship across the attacker's course, preventing Nadir from reaching the lifeboat. Pattersonian rescued eleven crew from Cantabria'''s lifeboats. Nadir captured 20 crew in the second lifeboat. This House of Lords judged this to be unlawful interference in British shipping, as Nadir obstructed the legal duty of rescuing seamen.

It was now dark and no more shots were being fired. H F Bailey arrived at the scene at 6.30 pm. Argüelles signalled the lifeboat with a torch, and it pulled along the starboard side of Cantabria, which was heavily listing. A line was thrown, and the children and Argüelles' wife were handed down to the lifeboat, followed by the steward and Argüelles. When the rescue was complete, Cantabria suddenly heeled over, damaging the lifeboat's stanchions. H F Bailey hastily got clear of Cantabria, which sank soon after at position . At least one sailor, Juan Gil, was lost with the vessel. Other sources report the loss of four crew members.

AftermathH F Bailey returned to Cromer, arriving at 8.15pm. Argüelles, his family and the steward were taken to the Red Lion Hotel, and Pattersonian took the other 11 rescued crewmen to Great Yarmouth. The BBC reported an account of the incident, along with a warning to shipping, giving the sunken Cantabrias position. British newspapers carried the story as headline news, but many of the crew at Yarmouth refused to be photographed, fearing Nationalist reprisals. Questions about the incident were asked in both Houses of Parliament.

Gestapo involvement
Two weeks after the sinking of Cantabria, Danish police released information that shed new light on the recent confrontation that proved that it had been no coincidence that Nadir had intercepted Cantabria. For some time, the Danish police had been interested in the Copenhagen correspondents for a German newspaper, one of whom was Horst von Pflugk-Harttung. He worked for the Berliner Börsen-Zeitung, which was an organ of the Ministry of the Reichswehr. Danish police arrested Hartnung and eight other Germans living in Denmark, along with three Danes, and charged them of operating as spies in Copenhagen.

Danish police proved that the accused had all been trained at Gestapo spy schools and had operated secret broadcasting stations, as well as engaging in nautical and hydrographical research. Between them they had drawn up maps and charts, graphs and complex mathematical tables of data. They communicated by complex codes, which they changed frequently. The outlay for so extensive an operation could be justified only as part of Third Reich preparation for war. The spy ring used the shadowing and sinking of Cantabria to demonstrate the complicated subversion mechanism that the Gestapo was developing. The sinking had been formulated by the Spanish insurgents, backed by their allies, as a warning to Britain. Franco was warning the British government that, unless she proved amenable, worse was to come. The Danish police investigation established that the attack was planned by Nazi Germany. As said above, Nadir and her sister ship Ciudad de Alicante'' used Emden as a supply base.

Horst von Pflugk-Hartnung
Horst von Pflugk-Hartung was a German spy, who along with his brother Georg, had previously been charged in Berlin for the assassination of the Socialist leaders, Karl Liebknecht and Rosa Luxemburg. Both men were acquitted but evidently many thought them guilty, for Georg was later assassinated. After Horst von Pflugk-Hartung's trial in Denmark, he was sentenced to only a year and a half in prison, and was released after a few months after German government pressure. He became a leading German intelligence chief in Denmark.

2006 tribute
Manuel Argüelles and his wife Trinidad later emigrated with their children to Mexico. In 2006, when the new Henry Blogg lifeboat museum was opened, Argüelles' son Ramón and daughter Begoña made a visit to pay tribute to Henry Blogg and his crew.

References

Bibliography

Military history of Norfolk
Merchant ships of Spain
Prison ships
Steamships of Spain
Second Spanish Republic
Maritime incidents in 1937
Maritime incidents in 1938
Spanish Civil War
Military units and formations of the Spanish Civil War
Conflicts in 1938
1938 in the United Kingdom
Merchant ships of Canada
Ships built in British Columbia
Shipwrecks of the Spanish Civil War
1918 ships
International maritime incidents
History of Norfolk
Atlantic naval operations of the Spanish Civil War
Shipwrecks of Norfolk